René Souriac (born 1941 in Saint-Frajou, Haute-Garonne) is a French scholar, a specialist of the history of Comminges.

After studying history at Toulouse, René Souriac passed his agrégation of history in 1966, and joined the Université Toulouse le Mirail in 1969.

A Doctor of Third Cycle in 1973, Doctor of State in 1987 on a subject concerning an example of administrative decentralization in the XVIth, the country of Comminges. Professor of the universities in 1989, he was interested in the cultural evolutions of European societies in the sixteenth, seventeenth and eighteenth centuries, hence his interest in the history of science at that time.

Publications 
1978: Le comté de Comminges au milieu du XVI° Siècle, Toulouse, CNRS
1996: Histoire de France 1750–1995, Toulouse, Presses Universitaires Mirail, 2 volumes.
2002: Les mots de la Renaissance, Toulouse, Presses Universitaires Mirail
2008: Les affrontements religieux en Europe, du début du XVIe au milieu du XVIIe, in collaboration with Pierre-Jean Souriac, Paris,

External links 
 René Souriac on Thèses.fr
 Publications de René Souriac on CAIRN
 René Souriac raconte l'histoire

French historians of religion
20th-century French historians
21st-century French historians
Academic staff of the University of Toulouse
People from Haute-Garonne
1941 births
Living people